Hans Liesche (October 11, 1891 – March 30, 1979) was a German athlete, who competed mainly in the high jump. He was born in Hamburg and died in Berlin. Liesche competed for Germany in the 1912 Summer Olympics held in Stockholm, Sweden in the high jump, where he won the silver medal.

References

External links
 profile

1891 births
1979 deaths
German male high jumpers
Olympic silver medalists for Germany
Athletes (track and field) at the 1912 Summer Olympics
Olympic athletes of Germany
Medalists at the 1912 Summer Olympics
Olympic silver medalists in athletics (track and field)